WUGA (91.7 MHz) is a public FM radio station serving Athens and much of the northeast part of Georgia.  It is a member of Georgia Public Broadcasting's radio network, but is operated by the University of Georgia, with studios and offices located at the Georgia Center for Continuing Education on the UGA campus.  The transmitter is located off Walter Sams Road in Winterville, Georgia, southeast of Athens.

The station's programming consists of news and public affairs, classical music, jazz and folk music from GPB Radio, as well as locally-produced content.

On March 1, 2010, UGA announced budget cuts that, if approved, would have resulted in the end of locally-produced programming on the station.  It would then have become a full-time relay of the GPB network.  However, WUGA remains operated by UGA, and during the early 2010s its operations were consolidated with WUGA-TV, a television station UGA owned at the time.

Translators
Since 1993, the station has operated a low-powered FM translator - originally W250AC at 97.9.  It moved to 94.5 as W233CA on March 23, 2017.  This "fill-in" transmitter was added to improve reception in the downtown Athens area, which can be poor due to terrain shielding and the main transmitter's relatively modest power (6,000 watts).  The University of Georgia also owns a student-operated college radio station, WUOG (90.5), which broadcasts and transmits from another location on campus. The two stations' operations are entirely separate from each other.

There are two other supposed translators that are listed in the FCC database as relays of the station.  However, these are licensed to Radio Assist Ministry, a religious organization not associated with GPB or UGA.  They are not listed by GPB, or given a station ID on the air, making them highly questionable.

There was a third such translator, W300BF 107.9 MHz in Commerce, Georgia, which, under RAM, repeated WUGA.  That repeater was sold to Athens Christian Radio, Inc. in 2007.  FCC records show it switched its programming source to WMJE in Clarkesville.

References

External links

Radio stations established in 1987
University of Georgia
Clarke County, Georgia
NPR member stations
UGA
1987 establishments in Georgia (U.S. state)